The Daytime Emmy Award for Outstanding Drama Series Directing Team is an award presented annually by the National Academy of Television Arts and Sciences (NATAS) and Academy of Television Arts & Sciences (ATAS). 

It was first awarded at the 1st Daytime Emmy Awards ceremony, held in 1974 when the award was originally called  Outstanding Individual Director for a Drama Series. Therefore, between 1974 and 1978; the award only honored individual directors. In 1979, the award was renamed Outstanding Direction for a Drama Series before using its current title years later. Since then, the award has honored the performances of the entire directing team participating in a form of a daytime drama. The awards ceremony was not aired on television in 1983 and 1984, having been criticized for lack of integrity. The Emmy was named after an "Immy," an affectionate term used to refer to the image orthicon camera tube. The statuette was designed by Louis McManus, who modeled the award after his wife, Dorothy. The Emmy statuette is fifteen inches tall from base to tip, weighs five pounds and is composed of iron, pewter, zinc and gold.

Richard Dunlap has received the most wins for his direction on The Young and the Restless, with a total of two. The soap opera holds the record for the most awards, winning on thirteen occasions (including Dunlap's wins), also  The Bold and the Beautiful tied in 2011 with the soap, which was the first tie in this category. The Young and the Restless has also received the most nominations, with a total of twenty-seven. CBS has been the network the most successful, with a total of nineteen wins.  As of the 2022 ceremony, General Hospital is the most recent recipient of the award.

Winners and nominees
Listed below are the winners of the award for each year, as well as the other nominees.

Outstanding Individual Director for a Drama Series

Outstanding Drama Series Directing Team

Total awards won

Notes

References

External links
 

Daytime Emmy Awards
Awards established in 1974
1974 establishments in the United States